Events in the year 1694 in Norway.

Incumbents
Monarch: Christian V

Events

Arts and literature

The foundation stone of Oslo Cathedral was laid.

Births
12 September – Johan von Mangelsen, military officer and businessperson (died 1769).

Deaths
17 August – , civil servant (born c. 1660).
Andrew Lawrenceson Smith, craftsman, woodcutter and painter (born c. 1620).

See also

References